Manmohan Acharya was a poet and lyricist from India. His Sanskrit poems and lyrics have been put to music and danced to in the Odissi classical Indian dance form. A devotional song from his Gitamohanam was featured in the 2009 Bollywood movie, The Desire. He was also a researcher and published author.

Early life

Manmohan Acharya was born in 1967 in Lathanga, a village in the Jagatsinghpur district of Orissa, India to Pandit Mayadhar Acharya and Parvati Devi.

Poetry
His poetry includes the following works:

Gitamohanam. One of its devotional songs features in the 2009 movie The Desire.<ref>{{cite news|title=Odissi dance to feature in Bollywood film 'The Desire |url=http://www.kalingatimes.com/entertainment_news/news/20090127_Odissi_dance_to_feature_in_Bollywood_film_The_Desire.htm |accessdate=22 July 2010 |newspaper=Kalinga Times |date=27 January 2009 |url-status=dead |archiveurl=https://web.archive.org/web/20100103090338/http://kalingatimes.com/entertainment_news/news/20090127_Odissi_dance_to_feature_in_Bollywood_film_The_Desire.htm |archivedate=3 January 2010 }}</ref>Gita-bhaaratam (lyrics). A compilation of patriotic songs.
Gita milindam (lyrics) consists of 15 songs with different rhythms.Palli-panchaasika (1987) - a Sanskrit minor poem (Khaṇḍakāvya)Subhasa-charitam - in Mahakavya styleSri Sivananda-Laharika - in Kāvya styleYati-giti-satakam (Sataka-kavya)

Dance drama
He has written dance dramas including:Arjuna-Pratijnaa Shrita-kamalamPada-pallavamDivya-Jayadevam RavanaPingalaaMrtyuSthitaprajnahTantramPurva-sakuntalamUttara-sakuntalam Translation Gitagovinda of Jayadev as Gitagovind Rasaavali''

Research

 Sistaachaara (Book)
 Maagha And Bhanja in Picture Poetry (book)
 Indian Trend of Human Rights
 An Algebraic Operation in Vedic Mathematics;
 Sharadindu-sundara-ruchih devi, Vani vaa Shakti-ruupini;
 Sixty Four Arts, A Study;
 Contribution of Sanskrit in Advancement of Oriya Language;
 An Encyclopedic Dictionary Of Yajurvedic Upanishads (Book)
 Vedic Research In Orissa during 20th Century
 Mind in Shiva-samkalpa hymn, A psycho-philosophical Analysis
 Bhaarata-pamkaja-dalamidam Utkal-mandala-miti viditam yat;
 Description of Heart in Upanisads
 Concept of Human Rights in Vedic Tradition;
 Vedic Trend of Human Rights vrs. Varna- Ashrama System;
 Financial Emergency : Kautilya's Arthashastra vis-a-vis Indian Constitution;
 Kavivara- Bhaarata-varsham Shrauta-puraatanamaarsham;
 Tarka Vaachaspati Madhusudan Mishra, A study
 Map of Puranic India

Awards
 Sanskrit Eloquency Award, Vikram University, Ujjain, M.P., 1990
 Vanikavi Award from Vanivinodi Parishad, Utkal University, 1991
 Doctor of Philosophy from Sri Jagannath Sanskrit University, 2003
 Gita-Saarasa Award from Christ College, Cuttack administration, 05.02.2005
 Delhi Sanskrit Academy Award for instant poem writing, 2007
 Ananda Bharadvaja Sammanah, 2007
 Lokakavyanidhi Award, from All India Lokabhasa Prachara Samiti, Puri, 2008
 Bharata-Bharati-Samman from National Sanskrit Sahitya Academy, 2009
 Abhinava Jayadeva Samman, 2009, Bhaktakavi Sri Jayadeva Samaroha samiti
 Sanskrit Sangeet Nataka Academy Award, 2010
 Fellowship of Vachaspati from Saraswati Research Institute
 Chinta Chetana National Baisakhi Award, 2012

Death
Acharya died at his residence in Cuttack on 2013.

References

External links

Narthaki
Sanskrit literature#Modern Sanskrit literature

Sanskrit poets
Poets from Odisha
Hindu poets
Indian lyricists
Musical theatre lyricists
1967 births
Living people
Indian male poets
20th-century Indian poets
20th-century Indian male writers